The Bavarian capital Munich was home to many military barracks. The first ones were located near the historical center of Munich. At the end of the 18th century a lot of military installations were built to the north of the historical center. Most of the installations were renamed during Nazi Germany, once more during the occupation of Germany after World War II when the installations were used by the United States Army, and once more when the Bundeswehr got them for use. Only three of them are currently used. The barracks of Munich are listed on a memorial stone which is located in Bayern-Kaserne.

Former barracks

Existing barracks

See also 
 List of United States Army installations in Germany

References

External links 
 
 Militär (German)
 U.S. Army installations - Munich, USAREUR

!
Munich
Military of Bavaria
Barracks
Barracks